East Timor first sent competitors to the Paralympic Games for the 2000 Summer Games in Sydney. The country at that time was not yet recognised as a sovereign state, and its athletes participated as "Individual Paralympic Athletes". There were only two: Alcino Pereira in track & field, in the men's 5,000m race (T38 category); and Mateus Lukas in men's powerlifting, in the up to 48 kg category. Pereira failed to complete his race, while Lukas lifted 105 kg, finishing 13th and last of the athletes who successfully lifted a weight in his category.

Formally recognised in 2002, East Timor participated in the 2004 Summer Olympics, but not in the Paralympics that same year. East Timor, as such, made its Paralympic Games début at the 2008 Summer Paralympics in Beijing, with a single representative (Lily Costa Silva) in powerlifting. Competing in the women's up to 52 kg category, Costa Silva failed to successfully lift a weight, and did not record a mark.

East Timor has never taken part in the Winter Paralympics.

Full results for East Timor at the Paralympics

See also
 Individual Paralympic Athletes at the 2000 Summer Paralympics
 East Timor at the Olympics

References

 
Paralympics